Pijovci is a dispersed settlement in the hills north of Šmarje pri Jelšah in eastern Slovenia. The Municipality of Šmarje pri Jelšah lies in the historical Styria region and is included in the Savinja Statistical Region.

References

External links
Pijovci at Geopedia

Populated places in the Municipality of Šmarje pri Jelšah